Dârlos is a commune located in Sibiu County, Transylvania, Romania. It is composed of three villages: Curciu (Kirtsch; Küküllőkőrös), Dârlos and Valea Lungă (Hosszúpatak).

At the 2011 census, 75.5% of inhabitants were Romanians, 19.1% Roma, 4.4% Hungarians and 0.9% Germans (more specifically Transylvanian Saxons).

The commune is located on the right bank of the Târnava Mare River, in the northeastern part of the county,  from Mediaș.

Natives 

 Ilarie Chendi

References 

Communes in Sibiu County
Localities in Transylvania